The 1959 UCI Road World Championships took place on 16 August 1959 in Zandvoort, Netherlands.

Results

Medal table

External links 

 Men's results
 Women's results
  Results at sportpro.it

 
UCI Road World Championships by year
UCI Road World Championships 1959
Uci Road World Championships, 1959
Uci Road World Championships, 1959
Sports competitions in Zandvoort